Trophis is a genus in the plant family Moraceae which includes about nine species, six of which are Neotropical and three which are Palaeotropical. It is dioecious, with male and female flowers borne on separate plants.

Recent work suggests that the genus is polyphyletic.

Selected species
Trophis branderhorstii (Diels) Corner
Trophis caucana (Pittier) C.C.Berg
Trophis cuspidata Lundell
Trophis drupacea (Diels) Corner
Trophis involucrata W.C.Burger
Trophis mexicana (Liebm.) Bureau
Trophis noraminervae Cuevas & Carvajal
Trophis philippinensis (Bureau) Corner
Trophis racemosa (L.) Urb.
Trophis scandens (Lour.) Hook. & Arn.

References

Moraceae
Moraceae genera
Dioecious plants